José Manuel Ferreira de Morais (born 27 July 1965) is a Portuguese professional football coach and former player.

Morais arrived at Inter Milan in July 2009 to replace the departing André Villas-Boas, who took the head coaching position with Académica de Coimbra. Hired by fellow countryman José Mourinho, the two reportedly first met at Benfica in 2000.

After head coach Mourinho terminated his contract with Inter, Morais followed Mourinho to Real Madrid in June 2010. Similarly, he then followed Mourinho to Chelsea in June 2013 following the end of Mourinho's managerial spell with Real Madrid. He then managed in his own right in several countries, winning two K League 1 titles with Jeonbuk Hyundai Motors in South Korea.

In June 2022, he signed for three seasons to manage Iranian club Sepahan.

Playing career
Morais' playing career started at the União de Leiria in 1984. He stayed there for two seasons before moving to Dragões de Alferrarede in 1986, playing there for two years. His next stint at Atlético CP lasted only one year. In 1990, he went on loan to Praiense before finally retiring in Penafiel after the 1990–91 season.

Coaching career
Morais worked with the Benfica youth team among several football clubs in Portugal, Swedish club Assyriska, Tunisian club Espérance, as well as once holding the head coach position for the Yemen national team. On 27 April 2002, he became the coach of Westfalia Herne in the German fourth division. Between 20 January 2003 and 30 June, he was the head coach from two times German champion Dresdner SC in the German third league.

On 13 July 2006, Morais joined Saudi Arabian club Al-Faisaly as manager. He left the club on 16 December 2006 following a 5–1 defeat to Al-Ittihad. On 6 June 2014, Morais was named as new manager of Saudi side Al-Shabab. He won Saudi Super Cup title after defeating Al Nassr in penalty shootout in his first match as Al-Shabab manager. For the 2014–15 season, Morais took a one-year sabbatical to become manager of Saudi Arabian team Al-Shabab before returning to Chelsea for the start of pre-season ahead of the 2015–16 Premier League campaign.
On 16 August 2018, Morais was appointed manager of Ukrainian Premier League club Karpaty Lviv. On 28 November 2018, Morais quit as manager of Ukrainian Premier League and was appointed as manager of South Korean K League 1 side Jeonbuk Hyundai Motors. He won the K League 1 in both of his first two seasons. In December 2020, he left Jeonbuk after his contract was terminated. In May 2021, Morais signed a contract until the end season with Saudi club Al Hilal.
on 24 June 2022, Morais joined Persian Gulf Pro League side Sepahan on a new three-year deal.

Managerial statistics

Honours
Espérance Tunis
Tunisian Ligue Professionnelle 1: 2009–10

Al-Shabab
Saudi Super Cup: 2014

Jeonbuk Hyundai Motors
K League 1: 2019, 2020
FA Cup: 2020

Al Hilal
Saudi Professional League: 2020–21
Individual
K League 1 Manager of the Year: 2019

References

1965 births
Living people
Footballers from Lisbon
Portuguese football managers
Expatriate football managers in Germany
Expatriate football managers in Greece
Expatriate football managers in Saudi Arabia
Expatriate football managers in South Korea
Expatriate football managers in Sweden
Expatriate football managers in Tunisia
Expatriate football managers in Turkey
S.L. Benfica B managers
G.D. Estoril Praia managers
SC Westfalia Herne managers
Dresdner SC managers
C.D. Santa Clara managers
Assyriska FF managers
Al-Faisaly FC managers
Al-Hazm FC managers
Stade Tunisien managers
Espérance Sportive de Tunis managers
Al Shabab FC (Riyadh) managers
Antalyaspor managers
AEK Athens F.C. managers
Barnsley F.C. managers
FC Karpaty Lviv managers
Jeonbuk Hyundai Motors managers
Al Hilal SFC managers
Real Madrid CF non-playing staff
Chelsea F.C. non-playing staff
Süper Lig managers
Super League Greece managers
Saudi Professional League managers
Liga Portugal 2 managers
Ukrainian Premier League managers
K League 1 managers
Portuguese expatriate football managers
Expatriate football managers in England
Expatriate football managers in Ukraine
Portuguese expatriate sportspeople in England
Portuguese expatriate sportspeople in Ukraine
Portuguese expatriate sportspeople in Germany
Portuguese expatriate sportspeople in Greece
Portuguese expatriate sportspeople in Saudi Arabia
Portuguese expatriate sportspeople in South Korea
Portuguese expatriate sportspeople in Sweden
Portuguese expatriate sportspeople in Tunisia
Portuguese expatriate sportspeople in Turkey
Portuguese expatriate sportspeople in Spain
Portuguese expatriate sportspeople in Yemen
Sepahan S.C. managers
Portuguese expatriate sportspeople in Iran
Persian Gulf Pro League managers
Expatriate football managers in Iran